On His Majesty's Secret Service is a 2009 Hong Kong comedy film, written, produced and directed by Wong Jing. The Chinese title is a parody of the title of the 1996 film Forbidden City Cop which starred Stephen Chow and was also produced by Wong, while the English title is a parody of the title of the James Bond film On Her Majesty's Secret Service.

Cast
 Louis Koo - Royal Dog
 Barbie Shu - Hopeful
 Sandra Ng - Empress
 Louis Fan - Lord Unicorn
 Lam Chi-chung - Royal Pig
 Law Kar-ying - Marco Solo
 Lee Kin-yan - Lady in waiting
 Lee Man-kwan - Palace Maid
 Bryan Leung - Clement
 Liu Yang - Gemini
 Liu Yiwei - Emperor
 Natalie Meng Yao - Head Palace Maid
 Song Jia - Princess Rainbow
 Tong Dawei - Royal Tiger
 Kingdom Yuen - Clementine

External links
 
 HK cinemagic entry

2009 films
2009 action comedy films
Hong Kong action comedy films
Hong Kong martial arts comedy films
2000s Cantonese-language films
Films directed by Wong Jing
2009 comedy films
2000s Hong Kong films